Cecilio Báez González (January 1, 1862 – June 18, 1941) was provisional President of Paraguay from December 8, 1905 to November 25, 1906. He was a member of the Liberal Party.

Early life and career

Dr. Cecilio Báez González was born in Asunción, capital of Paraguay on February 1, 1862. His parents were Nicholas Báez and Faustina González. His brothers were Otoniel, Benjamin, Modesta and Restituta Báez González.

He was married for 25 years to Marcelina Allende of Caazapa, daughter of Polycarpo Allende and Rosario Monges. They had 14 children, including Amadeo Báez Allende, Arminda Báez Allende, and Nicolas Báez Allende.

He studied at National College of the Capital in 1878.  After a year, he served as an intern at Santa Rosa for the monthly sum of 25 patacones.

He was in the first class in which the National University of Asuncion issued the first three diplomas of doctors in Law and Social Sciences on July 15, 1893. The diplomas were handed out in the following order: Cecilio Báez González, Gaspar Villamayor and Emeterio González.

He had a love of writing, which he expressed as a journalist and writer and was also dedicated to teaching and politics.

He served as dean of law, gave lectures in history, and was dean and rector of the National University.

During the government of José Félix Estigarribia, he was appointed Honorary Perpetual Rector of the Universidad Nacional. During his long career, he received several international honors, including membership in the Society of Social Sciences of Philadelphia in the United States, the Academia de Historia Havana and Société Académique de l'Histoire International Paris.

His written works included essays on civil liberties, autocracy in Paraguay, José Gaspar Rodríguez de Francia and dictatorship in South America, and a survey history of Paraguay.

He wrote several legal and historical works. He was known as Master of the Paraguayan Youth. He created one of the most comprehensive libraries of Paraguay. He died in Asuncion on June 18, 1941, at the age of 79 years.

Political career

He was interim President of the Republic, elected by the Assembly December 9, 1905 to replace Don Juan Bautista Gaona who was deposed. His cabinet was composed as follows: as Minister of Interior was Jose Emilio Perez, as Finance Minister Emiliano González Navero; in Foreign Affairs, Cayetano A. Careers and as minister of War and Navy was Benigno Ferreira. This was a period in which the terrible political instability did not prevent economic prosperity, the country passed through a stage very good in the economic sector.

During his government came the first cars to Paraguay; happened and so remembered the famous duel between Carlos Garcia and Freire Gomes Esteves, where Garcia died, was a good time for the country's economy was founded important industrial and commercial enterprises; were purchased the libraries Henry Solano Lopez and Blas Garay, built the Military Hospital, several streets were paved; declared imprescriptible land tax and municipal approving the statutes of the Society of Friends Education ", etc..

In the economic field is created by the Bank and the Paraguayan capital increase of the Paraguayan Industrial, including the integration of the capital of Agricultural Bank, which was circulating the issuance of 35 million pesos and general revenues reaching over 24 million and the award to Dr. Stanley of authorization to implement a service of steam between Areguá and San Bernardino.

In the field of education there were 347 primary schools with 30,000 pupils, while the University had 195 registered and 37 teachers, and the National College of the 633 students attending Capital and 72 teachers. They operated the Faculties of Law, Notaries, Medicine and Pharmacy.

Dr. Antolín Irala joined the Commission Inspector Corporations and had links with the bureaucracy poets Angel I. González, Jose Candido Diana, Daniel Jimenez Espinoza, Fortunato Toranzos (Jr.) and the musician Agustin Barrios. There were also ten newspapers and periodicals, and four magazines.

It was inaugurated, in addition, the Grand Hotel del Paraguay. It invested $ 65,000 in items for the College of Agriculture and Mr Ernesto Wenzel authorized the construction of a tram link between rural, 20 miles, the city of Villarrica at Cerro Pelado.

In 1891 after the revolution he suffered the coldness of exile. But he returned, happily, to his country next year.

Political biography

He participated in the creation of the Democratic Centre (later Liberal Party) on July 10, 1887. Cecilio Báez, as well as President of the Republic, was Advocate, Senator, President of the Superior Court of Justice and Minister of Foreign Affairs, Professor and during the government of Félix Paiva, 1937 and in 1938 was one of the signatories of the Treaty Peace with Bolivia, after completion of the Chaco War.

Served as chancellor with the presidents Juan B. Gaona in 1904, Benigno Ferreira in 1906 and Albino Jara in 1911. In Mexico, took delegations in 1903 and Great Britain and France in 1919. It was stressed as a spokesman of International Law at meetings held in Mexico, Chile and Cuba. In Mexico (1902) was an important action to defend the thesis of binding arbitration. He was also president of the International Commission of Jurists Congress Montevideo, in 1914.

References
 Biblioteca Virtual del Paraguay
 Biblioteca Virtual del Paraguay

((BD | 1892 | 1941 | Baez)) 

1862 births
1941 deaths
Presidents of Paraguay
People from Asunción
Liberal Party (Paraguay) politicians
Academic staff of Universidad Nacional de Asunción
Universidad Nacional de Asunción alumni
20th-century Paraguayan lawyers
Foreign Ministers of Paraguay
19th-century Paraguayan lawyers